William Meskill Bourke (2 June 1913 – 22 May 1981) was an Australian politician.

Bourke was elected to the Australian House of Representatives seat of Fawkner at the 1949 election representing the Australian Labor Party.  He was expelled from the Labor Party in 1955 for belonging to the Industrial Groups (Groupers) and joined the Australian Labor Party (Anti-Communist), later renamed the Democratic Labor Party.  He was defeated at the 1955 election by Peter Howson. He was educated at St Kevin's College, Melbourne.

Notes

1913 births
1981 deaths
Australian Labor Party members of the Parliament of Australia
Democratic Labour Party members of the Parliament of Australia
Members of the Australian House of Representatives for Fawkner
Members of the Australian House of Representatives
People educated at St Kevin's College, Melbourne
20th-century Australian politicians